Fez is a fictional character and one of the four male leads on the Fox Network's That '70s Show, also appearing in a minor role in the Netflix sequel That '90s Show portrayed by Wilmer Valderrama. He was the foreign exchange student in a group of six local teenagers.

Origins
Fez was born on August 4, 1960. His real name is deemed unpronounceable by his friends, so they call him "Fez" (a homophone of "FES", an acronym for foreign exchange student). The series' official web site explains the spelling "Fez", as opposed to "Fes", as "poetic license".

Fez's country of origin is one of the longest running gags on the show.

In That '90s Show, Fez and Jackie broke up when she cheated by returning to Kelso (including having their son Jay), after which Fez became a successful businessman by opening a beauty salon called "Chez Fez". He is now dating the Forman's next door neighbor Sherri, mother of Gwen and Nate.

References

External links
 Mastro, Dana. and Morawitz, Elizabeth. Latino Representation on Primetime Television: A Content Analysis, Section Stereotypes of Latinos, pp. 7.
 Thanu Yakupitiyage Battling or Creating Stereotypes in ‘Aliens in America’?, October 19, 2007, Racewire.
 Ben Megargel Reality spin-off falls into familiar traps, The Michigan Daily, February 6, 2007.

That '70s Show characters
Fictional cannabis users
Fictional characters from Wisconsin
Television characters introduced in 1998
Fictional immigrants to the United States
Male characters in television
Teenage characters in television